The Sweetwater Union High School District is a school district headquartered in Chula Vista, California. , the school district is the largest secondary school district in California.

The union high school district serves over 42,000 high school-aged students and over 32,000 adult learners. Located in the southwestern part of San Diego County between Southeast San Diego and the International Border with Mexico, the district serves the communities of Chula Vista, Imperial Beach, National City and the San Ysidro portion of San Diego.

Sweetwater is one of the most ethnically and economically diverse districts in California. Approximately 87 percent of students belong to an ethnic minority group and over 40 percent of students qualify for the free or reduced lunch program.

Overseen by a five-member Board of Trustees, the district operates 14 high schools (11 regular, two alternative, one charter); 11 middle schools; 4 Adult schools; a regional occupational program (ROP); and special education.

The district has earned recognition for its "Compact for Success" program, a deal made with San Diego State University that guarantees Sweetwater graduates admission to the university if they meet certain requirements all throughout their high school career.

Schools

High schools

Bonita Vista High School
Castle Park High School
Chula Vista High School
Eastlake High School
Hilltop High School
Independent Study High School
MAAC Community Charter School
Mar Vista High School
Montgomery High School
Olympian High School
Options Secondary School 
Otay Ranch High School
Palomar High School
San Ysidro High School
Southwest High School
Sweetwater High School
East Hills Academy

Junior High school
Granger Junior High School

Middle schools 
Bonita Vista Middle School
Castle Park Middle School
Chula Vista Middle School
Eastlake Middle School
Hilltop Middle School
Mar Vista Academy
Montgomery Middle School
National City Middle School
Rancho Del Rey Middle School
Southwest Middle School

Compact for Success
In 1999, former Sweetwater Union School District superintendent Ed Brand met with once San Diego State University president Stephan Weber to try and overcome the small number of students enrolling and graduating from San Diego State University. In order to address this issue, Brand and Weber engineered the idea of compact for success which would be a long-term partnership between Sweetwater Union School District and SDSU. Before Compact for Success could be put into execution, SDSU staff and Sweetwater School Board teachers worked with one another to alter the curriculum in order to concur with the requirements for college admission in California. After the curriculum was adjusted, students within the Sweetwater Union School District would be guaranteed admission to San Diego State University if they could meet the five benchmarks set out by the partnership between Brand and Weber. In order to qualify for compact for success, students must remain in the Sweetwater District from 7th grade onward. Along with this the requirements for admission are: maintaining a 3.0 GPA, fulfilling all A-G requirements, passing the English and Math proficiency test, and lastly, taking the either the SAT or ACT. Along with guaranteed admission through the program, students from 7th grade onward will take multiple field trips to San Diego State University and will have mentors along the way to help guide students by helping them prepare for a higher education at a university. Compact for Success went into the execution in the fall of 2000 and with that year incoming 7th graders enrolled in the district. From 2000 to 2012, compact for success has caused an 87% increase in Sweetwater students enrolling in San Diego State University; applications increased from 789 in 2000 to 1,770 in 2012. As of 2012 compact of success has resulted in 1 of every 7 SDSU students being former Sweetwater School district students. Compact for Success was recognized in June 2012 by National Journal as a “leading innovator” in higher education and has served as a template for other programs. This partnership has influenced other ones like it around San Diego County, such as the one between Vista Unified School District and California State University San Marcos.

"Pay for Play Scandal"
For four years, the ex-superintendent of the Sweetwater Union High School District, Jesus Gandara, along with four of his colleagues “regularly accepted what amounted to bribes in exchange for their votes on multimillion-dollar construction projects”, using bond money from proposition O. When the law caught up with Jesus Gandara, former SUHSD Superintendent, SUHSD trustees Arlie Ricassa and Pearl Quinones, former board member Greg Sandoval, and a construction company executive Henry Amigable, they all pleaded not guilty to the allegations made against them, including but not limited to: charges of perjury, filing a false document, and offering a bribe. The individuals involved in this scandal were said to have been spending thousands of dollars visiting San Diego-area restaurants, as well as accepting tickets to popular sports events and vacation getaways on a consistent basis from the year 2008 until 2011. Four board members involved were removed from the school board and reelections began, but this time based on geographic location instead of the votes counted altogether.

References

External links
 SUHSD Website

School districts in San Diego County, California
Education in San Diego
Education in Chula Vista, California
National City, California
Imperial Beach, California
South Bay (San Diego County)